Brigadier Edward Percival Allman-Smith MC (3 November 1886 – 17 November 1969) was an Irish soldier and field hockey player.

Hockey player
Allman-Smith played hockey for Dublin University Hockey Club and Ireland. He was a member of the Ireland team that won the silver medal at the 1908 London Olympics. Allman-Smith played in both the 3–1 win against Wales on 29 October and in the 8–1 defeat against England in the final on 31 October. The Ireland team was part of the Great Britain Olympic team.

Military career
During the First World War Allman-Smith served as an officer in the   
Royal Army Medical Corps. Between 1941 and 1942 he served as Deputy Director of Medical Services for Mandatory Palestine and Trans-Jordan.

References

External links
 
Generals of World War II

1886 births
1969 deaths
Members of the Ireland hockey team at the 1908 Summer Olympics
Irish male field hockey players
British Army personnel of World War I
British Army brigadiers of World War II
Royal Army Medical Corps officers
Alumni of Trinity College Dublin
Medalists at the 1908 Summer Olympics
Olympic silver medallists for Great Britain
Irish officers in the British Army
Ireland international men's field hockey players
Dublin University Hockey Club players